The 1855 Atlantic hurricane season featured tropical cyclone landfalls in the Gulf Coast of the United States, the Greater Antilles, and Mexico, but none along the East Coast of the United States. It was inactive, with only five known tropical cyclones. Operationally, another tropical storm was believed to have existed offshore Atlantic Canada in late August and early September, but HURDAT – the official Atlantic hurricane database – now excludes this system. The first system, Hurricane One, was initially observed on August 6. The final storm, Hurricane Five, was last observed on September 17. These dates fall within the period with the most tropical cyclone activity in the Atlantic. At one point during the season, two tropical cyclones existed simultaneously. Two of the cyclones only have a single known point in their tracks due to a sparsity of data, so storm summaries for those systems are unavailable.

Of the season's five tropical cyclones, four reached hurricane status. Furthermore, one of those four strengthened into a major hurricane, which are Category 3 or higher on the modern-day Saffir–Simpson hurricane wind scale. The strongest cyclone of the season, Hurricane Five, peaked at Category 3 strength with  winds. It brought only minor impact to Louisiana and Mississippi. The first storm of the season brought locally severe impact to Tampico, Tamaulipas, Mexico in early August. Tropical Storm Four caused severe damage in the Lesser Antilles.

Timeline

Systems

Hurricane One

Based on newspaper reports, the first hurricane of the season was within the vicinity of Tampico, Tamaulipas on August 6. No further information is available on the meteorological history of this storm. However, it is possible that the storm developed in the Caribbean in late July, due to data obtained from the barque Bercaldine. Torrential rainfall in the Tampico area caused disastrous flooding, with heavy damage to goods and property. Eleven vessels were docked at Tampico, some of which lost their cargo. At the mouth of the Pánuco River, a pilot station and a fort were swept away. The event was considered "the worst inundation of Tampico over the last 30 years".

Hurricane Two

Data from the James Foster Jr. and Rebecca indicate that the storm moved rapidly northeastward.

Hurricane Three

Shortly thereafter, HMS Walverine was wrecked and no further information is known about this storm.

Tropical Storm Four

It initially headed westward, before re-curving west-northwestward early on the following day. Shortly thereafter, the storm passed through the Windward Islands between Grenada and Saint Vincent and the Grenadines. The storm peaked with winds of  while moving northwestward across the Caribbean Sea. It weakened slightly before making landfall near San Pedro de Macorís, Dominican Republic with winds of  early on August 27. The storm slowly weakened over Hispaniola and was last noted near Bombardopolis, Haiti later that day.

There was considerable damage in the Lesser Antilles. On Saint Vincent, rains destroyed roads and a number of houses. Many sugar cane fields were also ruined. Several vessels were lost there and on other islands, including Barbados, Dominica, and Martinique. On Saint Croix in the present-day U.S. Virgin Islands, at least one vessel was destroyed by the heavy gales. There were also strong gales reported in Puerto Rico and Dominican Republic.

Hurricane Five

The Middle Gulf Shore Hurricane of 1855

It strengthened quickly while moving northward, becoming a Category 2 hurricane later that day. Shortly thereafter, the hurricane made landfall near Buras-Triumph, Louisiana at the same intensity. It weakened after moving inland, decreasing to Category 1 intensity later on September 16. Early on the following day, the system weakened to a tropical storm, several hours before dissipating over central Alabama.

This was regarded as the worst hurricane in the region since 1819. In Louisiana, winds and storm surge impacted the eastern portions of the state. The wharf and bathhouse in Proctorville were swept away. About  of water was reported at Proctor's Landing. A combination of strong winds and storm surge destroyed a number of houses along the shores of Lake Borgne. Along the coast of Mississippi, most structures were swept to sea. The foundation of the Biloxi Lighthouse was endangered due to erosion from this storm. The Cat Island Lighthouse was also left in "severe peril". Several ships were damaged or capsized in the Mississippi River, including Atchafalaya, J.S. Chenoweth, Ship Shoal, and Venice.

Other systems
In addition to the five tropical systems, another storm was operationally believed to have existed in late August and early September. The ship Atlantic encountered a very heavy gale while located west of Sable Island, Nova Scotia on August 31. The storm moved rapidly east-northeastward offshore Atlantic Canada. It was last noted on September 2 and was thought to have transitioned into an extratropical cyclone. However, HURDAT no longer includes this system in its database.

See also

 Atlantic hurricane season
 List of Atlantic hurricanes

References

 
Atlantic hurricane seasons
Hurricanes
1855 meteorology
August 1855 events
September 1855 events